Başkənd (also, Bashkand and Bashkend) is a village in the Khojaly District of Azerbaijan.

References

External links 

Populated places in Khojaly District